Coppola is a common Italian surname. Notable people with the surname include:

Music
 Anton Coppola (1917–2020), American composer and conductor, brother of Carmine Coppola
 Carmine Coppola (1910–1991), American composer, father of August Coppola, Francis Ford Coppola, and Talia Shire
 Piero Coppola (1888–1971), Italian conductor
 Roman Coppola (born 1965), American music video director
 Tom Coppola (born 1945), American musician

Film and television
Listed alphabetically by first name
 Alicia Coppola (born 1968), American television actress
 August Coppola (1934–2009), American author and film executive
 Christopher Coppola (born 1962), American director and digital media entrepreneur
 Francis Ford Coppola (born 1939), American film director
 Gian-Carlo Coppola (1963–1986), American film producer
 Horacio Coppola (1906–2012), Argentine photographer and filmmaker
 Nicolas Cage, (born 1964 as Nicholas Kim Coppola), American actor
 Sofia Coppola (born 1971), American film director
 Talia Shire (born 1946 as Talia Coppola), American actress

Sports
 Carmine Coppola (footballer) (born 1979), Italian footballer
 Ferdinando Coppola (born 1978), Italian football goalkeeper
 Mario Coppola (footballer) (born 1990), Italian footballer

Crime
 Frank J. Coppola (1944–1982), American man executed for murder
 Mike Coppola (mobster) (1900–1966), American mobster in New York City known as "Trigger Mike"
 Mikey Coppola (born 1946), American mobster in New Jersey known as "Mikey Cigars"

Other fields
 Ginny Coppola (born 1949), American politician in Massachusetts, wife of Michael J. Coppola
 Mario Coppola (1937–2011), Italian physicist
 Michael J. Coppola (1942–2005), American politician in Massachusetts

See also
 Coppola family tree
 Coppola (disambiguation)

Italian-language surnames